The Peninsula Times Tribune was a daily newspaper serving Palo Alto, Redwood City, and neighboring cities in the San Francisco Peninsula of California. It was published by the Tribune Newspaper Company from 1979 to 1993.

History
The Times Tribune was the result of a 1979 merger between the Palo Alto Times (which began publication in 1893 or 1894) and the Redwood City Tribune. The Times Tribune ceased publication on March 12, 1993. Circulation had fallen from 65,000 at the time of the merger to about 40,000, owing to competition from the San Francisco Chronicle, San Jose Mercury News, and San Mateo County Times. At the behest of the Palo Alto City Council, 39 file cabinets and 69 boxes of clippings were professionally archived in 1994 and distributed to local historical societies.

References

Tribune Publishing
Defunct newspapers published in California
Defunct daily newspapers
Daily newspapers published in the San Francisco Bay Area
Newspapers established in 1979
1979 establishments in California
Publications disestablished in 1993
1993 disestablishments in California
Palo Alto, California
Redwood City, California